Mary Murphy (January 26, 1931 – May 4, 2011) was an American film and television actress of the 1950s, 1960s and 1970s.

Early years
Murphy was born in Washington, D.C., and was the second of three children. She spent part of her early childhood in Rocky River, Ohio, a westside Cleveland, Ohio suburb. Her father, James Victor Murphy, died in 1940. Shortly afterwards, she and her mother moved to Southern California. She attended University High School in West Los Angeles.

While working as a package wrapper at Saks Fifth Avenue, Beverly Hills, she was signed to appear in films for Paramount Pictures in 1951.

Film 
She first gained attention in 1953, when she played a good-hearted girl who is intrigued by Marlon Brando in The Wild One. The following year, she appeared opposite Tony Curtis in Beachhead, and with Dale Robertson in Sitting Bull, and the year after that as Fredric March's daughter in the thriller The Desperate Hours, which also starred Humphrey Bogart.  She co-starred with actor-director Ray Milland in his Western A Man Alone. That was one of her best roles; another was in the film she made the following year for Joseph Losey,  The Intimate Stranger (1956).

Television 
Murphy co-starred with James Franciscus and James Philbrook in the 1961 CBS crime adventure-drama series The Investigators. Among her other television appearances, she was featured in the title role of defendant Eleanor Corbin in the 1962 Perry Mason episode "The Case of the Glamorous Ghost". She also appeared in dozens of other television series including The Lloyd Bridges Show, The Tab Hunter Show, I Spy, The Outer Limits , The Fugitive, and Ironside. She was absent from the big screen for seven years before resuming her film career in 1972 with Steve McQueen in Junior Bonner.

Personal life
On June 3, 1956, Murphy married actor Dale Robertson in Yuma, Arizona. The marriage was annulled after six months. She had a daughter. She married Alan Specht in 1962 and divorced in 1967.

Death 
On May 4, 2011, Murphy died of heart disease at her home in Beverly Hills, California, aged 80.

Filmography

 The Lemon Drop Kid (1951) - Girl (uncredited)
 Darling, How Could You! (1951) - Sylvia
 When Worlds Collide (1951) - Student (uncredited)
 Westward the Women (1951) - Pioneer Woman (uncredited)
 My Favorite Spy (1951) - Manicurist (uncredited)
 Sailor Beware (1952) - Girl (uncredited)
 Aaron Slick from Punkin Crick (1952) - Girl in Bathtub (uncredited)
 The Atomic City (1952) - Young Woman Buying Stamps (uncredited)
 Carrie (1952) - Jessica Hurstwood
 The Turning Point (1952) - Secretary (uncredited)
 Off Limits (1952) - WAC
 Houdini (1953) - Girl (uncredited)
 Main Street to Broadway (1953) - The Actress - Mary Craig
 The Wild One (1953) - Kathie Bleeker
 Beachhead (1954) - Nina Bouchard
 Make Haste to Live (1954) - Randy Benson
 The Mad Magician (1954) - Karen Lee
 Sitting Bull (1954) - Kathy Howell
 Hell's Island (1955) - Janet Martin
 The Desperate Hours (1955) - Cindy Hilliard
 A Man Alone (1955) - Nadine Corrigan
 The Maverick Queen (1956) - Lucy Lee
 The Intimate Stranger (1956) - Evelyn Stewart
 Escapement (1958) - Ruth Vance
 Live Fast, Die Young (1958) - Kim Winters / Narrator
 Crime and Punishment U.S.A. (1959) - Sally
 The Restless Gun (1959) Episode "Four Lives"
 Two Before Zero (1962)
 40 Pounds of Trouble (1962) - Liz McCluskey
 Harlow (1965) - Sally Doane
 Junior Bonner (1972) - Ruth Bonner
 I Love You... Good-bye (1974) - Pam Parks
 Born Innocent (1974) - Miss Murphy

References

Bibliography

External links

Mary Murphy on the cover of Tempo Magazine, May 16 1955

1931 births
2011 deaths
American film actresses
American television actresses
Actresses from Cleveland
Actresses from Washington, D.C.
21st-century American women